École Évangéline is a Canadian francophone school in Abram-Village, Prince Edward Island for students that attend the school come from the central parts of Prince County, including the City of Summerside.

The school is administratively part of the Commission scolaire de langue française. Its official colours are Blue and Gold and the mascot is a Coyote. The sports teams from "Évangéline" are called the Évangéline Coyotes.

See also
List of schools in Prince Edward Island
List of school districts in Prince Edward Island

References 

High schools in Prince Edward Island
Schools in Prince County, Prince Edward Island
Educational institutions in Canada with year of establishment missing